Brigadier-General Sir Godfrey Vignoles Thomas, 9th Baronet,  (27 March 1856 – 17 February 1919) was a British Army officer of the First World War.

Early life
Thomas was the son of Sir Godfrey John Thomas, 8th Baronet and Emily Chambers. On 13 July 1861, he succeeded to his father's baronetcy.

Military career
He was educated at the Royal Military Academy, Woolwich and commissioned into the Royal Artillery in 1875. He served in the Second Anglo-Afghan War from 1878 to 1880, and in the Anglo-Egyptian War of 1884. He was promoted to Major in 1892. Thomas was promoted to Colonel in 1899 and fought in the Second Anglo-Boer War between 1899 and 1901, during which he was twice mentioned in dispatches. In 1901 he was made a Companion of the Distinguished Service Order, and a Companion of the Order of the Bath in 1904. Between 1909 and 1911 he was brigadier-general of the 3rd Division Artillery, before serving as the brigadier-general of 24th Division Artillery between 1914 and 1915.

He fought in the First World War in France, and was invested as a Commander of the Order of the British Empire in 1916. From 1916 to 1917 Thomas was Brigadier-General of the No. 2 Reserve Brigade RFA (Territorial Forces).

Personal life
He married Mary Frances Isabelle Oppenheim, daughter of Charles Augustus Oppenheim and Isabelle Frith, on 30 April 1887. Following his early death in 1919, he was succeeded in his title by his son, Godfrey, who served as a courtier to the Royal Family.

He was appointed a Deputy Lieutenant of Essex on 1 May 1912.  In the 1919 Birthday Honours, he was posthumously awarded the Commander of the Order of the British Empire, "for valuable services rendered in connection with the War."

He died of influenza on 17 February 1919, and was buried at St Mary & St Hugh, Old Harlow.

References

External links
Masonic career

1856 births
1919 deaths
Baronets in the Baronetage of England
British Army generals of World War I
British Army personnel of the Second Boer War
Royal Artillery officers
Commanders of the Order of the British Empire
Companions of the Distinguished Service Order
Companions of the Order of the Bath
Deputy Lieutenants of Essex
Freemasons of the United Grand Lodge of England
Deaths from Spanish flu